Michael A. Pikos is an American implant oral and maxillofacial surgeon known as the CEO/Founder of Coastal Jaw Surgery and Pikos Institute.

Background and education
Pikos was born in Campbell, Ohio. He  holds a BS degree in Biology from the Ohio State University and a DDS degree from the Ohio State University College of Dentistry, Columbus, Ohio.

He did his Residency in Oral and Maxillofacial Surgery at University of Pittsburgh, Montefiore Hospital, Pittsburgh, PA. He also completed an Internship at Miami Valley Hospital, Dayton, Ohio.

Career
Pikos has been in the field of implant surgery for years. In 1983, he founded Coastal Jaw Surgery. He also founded Pikos Institute in Trinity, Florida and Pinnacle Study Club of Tampa Bay.

Pikos lectures and speaks on various aspects of implantology throughout not only the US, but the world as well. He is on the Editorial Board of the Implant Dentistry Journal, and the Journal of Implant and Advanced Clinical Dentistry. He is the author of  Bone Augmentation in Implant Dentistry: A Step-by-Step Guide to Predictable Alveolar Ridge and Sinus Grafting. He has written several published articles on implant oral and maxillofacial surgery.

Professorship
Pikos is an Adjunct Associate Professor at the Department of Periodontology and Prosthodontics, University of Alabama at Birmingham. He is a Courtesy Clinician Associate Professor at the Department of Periodontology and Prosthodontics, University of Florida College of Dentistry.

He is also an Adjunct Professor, Department of Oral and Maxillofacial Surgery at:
 The Ohio State University College of Dentistry
 Nova Southeastern University College of Dental Medicine, and 
 Aristotle University of Thessaloniki, Greece, School of Dentistry.

Diplomacy
Pikos is the Scientific Advisor on Implants for the Kois Center. He is a Diplomate of: 
 The American Board of Oral and Maxillofacial Surgery
 The American Board or Oral Implantology/Implant Dentistry
 The International Congress of Oral Implantologists
 The American Academy of Osseointegration.

Awards
 2006 -  Received the Aaron Gershkoff Memorial Award from the American Academy of Implant Dentistry
 2015 - Received the Saul Schluger Memorial Award for Top Educator
 2017 - First recipient of the Carl E. Misch Advanced Dental Implant Studies Education Award.

See also
 Restorative dentistry

References

External links
 Coastal Jaw Surgery website
 Pikos Institute website
 Pinnacle Study Club website

Living people
American dentists
American dentistry academics
American physicians
Ohio State University College of Arts and Sciences alumni
Year of birth missing (living people)
Ohio State University College of Dentistry alumni
American chief executives